Dan Gritti is an American football coach. He served as the head football coach at  Rhodes College in Memphis, Tennessee from 2011 to 2015 and Millikin University in Decatur, Illinois from 2016 to 2021.

Grittin holds a Juris Doctor degree from the University of Wisconsin and an undergraduate degree from Vanderbilt University.

Head coaching record

References

External links
 Millikin profile

Year of birth missing (living people)
Living people
Chicago Maroons football coaches
Indiana Hoosiers football coaches
Middlebury Panthers football coaches
Millikin Big Blue football coaches
Rhodes Lynx football coaches
Vanderbilt Commodores football coaches
University of Wisconsin Law School alumni
Vanderbilt University alumni